Koungou is the second largest commune in the French overseas department of Mayotte, in the Indian Ocean, after the capital Mamoudzou.
It is composed of six villages: Majicavo Lamir, Majicavo Koropa, Koungou, Trévani, Kangani and Longoni.

Population

References

Populated places in Mayotte
Communes of Mayotte